The 2019 CECEFA U-20 Challenge Cup will take place from 21 September to 5 October 2019  in Uganda. It was originally expected to take place in January 2019.

Venues

Pece War Memorial Stadium, Gulu, Uganda
FUFA Technical Center, Njeru, Uganda

Teams

Officials 

Referees
  Eric Manirakiza (Burundi)
  Dinareh Mohamed Guedi (Djibouti)
  Israel Mpaima (Kenya)
  Lemma Nigussi (Ethiopia)
  Yonas Zekarias Ghebre (Eritrea)
  (ms) Jonesia Kabakama Rukyaa (Tanzania)
  Martin Sanya (Tanzania)
  Mahmood Shantair Ismael (Sudan)
  Alex Muhabi (Uganda)
  Ali Mfaume Nassoro  (Zanzibar)

Assistant Referees
  Oliver Odhiambo (Kenya)
  Ali Mohamed Mahad (Somalia)
  Belachew Yetayew  (Ethiopia)
  Michael Bereket (Eritrea)
  (ms) Jane Cherono Jebet  (Kenya)
  Frank John Komba (Tanzania)
  Nour Abdi Mohamed (Somalia)
  Ronald Katenya (Uganda)
  Robert Henry Duwuki Simbe (South Sudan)
  Musa Balikowa (Uganda)

Group stage

Group A

Group B

Group C

Knockout stage

Quarter-finals

Semi-finals

3rd Place match

Finals

Champion

References 

2019 in African football